Sigfrid Rafael Karsten (16 August 1879 — 21 February 1956) was a Finnish social anthropologist and philosopher of religion, known especially for his work among the indigenous people of Southern America.

Career
Rafael Karsten was born in Kvevlax, Grand Duchy of Finland, to a very religious family, and his native language was Swedish. He studied philosophy at the University of Helsinki in 1899–1902 and had his first job at the British Museum.

A student of Edvard Westermarck, Karsten was critical of theological explanations of religions. He was a critic of Christianity and state religion, and a proponent of freedom of religion. Karsten defended his doctoral thesis, The Origin of Worship: A Study in Primitive Religion, in 1905 at the University of Helsinki. He was a member of the Prometheus Society, a student society promoting freedom of thought and freedom of religion.

In total, Karsten travelled six times in Southern America and studied the indigenous people and their religions — in Bolivia and Argentine, 1911–1913, in Ecuador, 1916–1918, and in the Amazonas, 1946–1947, and others — and published extensively on them in Swedish, Finnish, German, English, and Spanish. He also authored several academic course books on sociology and social anthropology.

Karsten served as the professor of practical philosophy at the University of Helsinki in 1922–1946. His pupils include Arne Runeberg.

Karsten died in Helsinki, aged 76.

Publications in English (selection)
 The Origin of Worship: A Study in Primitive Religion (1905)
 Contributions to the Sociology of the Indian Tribes of Ecuador (1920)
 The Religion of the Jibaro Indians of eastern Ecuador (1922)
 Civilization of the South American Indians, with Special Reference to Magic and Religion (1926)
 Indian Tribes of the Argentine and Bolivian Gran Chaco (1932)
 The Headhunters of Western Amazonas (1935)
 A Totalitarian State of the Past: The Civilization of the Inca Empire in Ancient Peru (1949)

Sources

Further reading
 
 Acta Americana, Vol 1, No. 2, 1993. (Special issue on Rafael Karsten.)

External links
 Rafael Karsten (1879–1956), a Finnish Scholar of Religion. Biography by Ilona Salomaa.

1879 births
1956 deaths
Finnish philosophers
Finnish ethnologists
Academic staff of the University of Helsinki
Finnish explorers
Religion academics
Swedish-speaking Finns
Critics of Christianity
People from Ostrobothnia (region)